Lee Loughridge is an artist who has worked as a colorist in the comics industry. He is possibly best known for his work on the various Batman Adventures titles.

Bibliography
His other work includes such titles as:
Accelerate
Angel
Arkham Asylum: Living Hell
The Batman Adventures
The Final Night
Just Imagine...
100% Marvel
Marvel Zombies Return (Marvel Comics, 2009)
Saucer Country
Stumptown
The Mask: I Pledge Allegiance to the Mask

Awards
Loughridge was nominated for the International Horror Guild Award for best illustrated narrative in 2001 for his work on the comic edition of The House on the Borderland. He was also nominated for a Hugo Award for his work on Fables; War and Pieces.

He has been recognized for his work with a nomination for the Comics' Buyer's Guide Favorite Colorist Award in 2004.

Notes

References

External links
Lee Loughridge at Comic Vine

Living people
Year of birth missing (living people)
American comics artists
Place of birth missing (living people)